is a Japanese politician of the Liberal Democratic Party, a member of the House of Representatives in the Diet (national legislature). A native of Yaizu, Shizuoka and graduate of Keio University, he worked at the public broadcaster NHK from 1974 to 2003. In 2003, he was elected to the House of Representatives for the first time.  He represents the 2nd District of Shizuoka prefecture, which includes the cities of Yaizu and Shimada, as well as Haibara county.

References

External links 
 Official website in Japanese.

Members of the House of Representatives (Japan)
Keio University alumni
Politicians from Shizuoka Prefecture
Living people
1952 births
Liberal Democratic Party (Japan) politicians
21st-century Japanese politicians